Cornelia Lăzeanu (born 22 June 1943) is a Romanian volleyball player. She competed in the women's tournament at the 1964 Summer Olympics.

References

1943 births
Living people
Romanian women's volleyball players
Olympic volleyball players of Romania
Volleyball players at the 1964 Summer Olympics
Sportspeople from Craiova